Legislative elections were held in France on 4 November 1837. 

Only citizens paying taxes were eligible to vote. 151,720 of the 198,836 registered voters voted.

Aftermath
Louis-Philippe of France dissolved the legislature in the absence of a majority on 2 February 1839.

References

Legislative elections in France
France
Legislative
France